In mathematics, a symplectic vector space is a vector space V over a field F (for example the real numbers R) equipped with a symplectic bilinear form.

A symplectic bilinear form is a mapping  that is
 Bilinear Linear in each argument separately;
 Alternating  holds for all ; and
 Non-degenerate  for all  implies that .

If the underlying field has characteristic not 2, alternation is equivalent to skew-symmetry. If the characteristic is 2, the skew-symmetry is implied by, but does not imply alternation. In this case every symplectic form is a symmetric form, but not vice versa. 

Working in a fixed basis, ω can be represented by a matrix. The conditions above are equivalent to this matrix being skew-symmetric, nonsingular, and hollow (all diagonal entries are zero). This should not be confused with a symplectic matrix, which represents a symplectic transformation of the space. If V is finite-dimensional, then its dimension must necessarily be even since every skew-symmetric, hollow matrix of odd size has determinant zero.  Notice that the condition that the matrix be hollow is not redundant if the characteristic of the field is 2. A symplectic form behaves quite differently from a symmetric form, for example, the scalar product on Euclidean vector spaces.

Standard symplectic space

The standard symplectic space is R2n with the symplectic form given by a nonsingular, skew-symmetric matrix. Typically ω is chosen to be the block matrix

where In is the  identity matrix. In terms of basis vectors :

A modified version of the Gram–Schmidt process shows that any finite-dimensional symplectic vector space has a basis such that ω takes this form, often called a Darboux basis or symplectic basis.

There is another way to interpret this standard symplectic form. Since the model space R2n used above carries much canonical structure which might easily lead to misinterpretation, we will use "anonymous" vector spaces instead. Let V be a real vector space of dimension n and V∗ its dual space. Now consider the direct sum  of these spaces equipped with the following form:

Now choose any basis  of V and consider its  dual basis

We can interpret the basis vectors as lying in W if we write . Taken together, these form a complete basis of W,

The form ω defined here can be shown to have the same properties as in the beginning of this section. On the other hand, every symplectic structure is isomorphic to one of the form . The subspace V is not unique, and a choice of subspace V is called a polarization. The subspaces that give such an isomorphism are called Lagrangian subspaces or simply Lagrangians.

Analogy with complex structures
Just as every symplectic structure is isomorphic to one of the form , every complex structure on a vector space is isomorphic to one of the form . Using these structures, the tangent bundle of an n-manifold, considered as a 2n-manifold, has an almost complex structure, and the cotangent bundle of an n-manifold, considered as a 2n-manifold, has a symplectic structure: .

The complex analog to a Lagrangian subspace is a real subspace, a subspace whose complexification is the whole space: . As can be seen from the standard symplectic form above, every symplectic form on R2n is isomorphic to the imaginary part of the standard complex (Hermitian) inner product on Cn (with the convention of the first argument being anti-linear).

Volume form
Let ω be an alternating bilinear form on an n-dimensional real vector space V, . A volume form on a n-dimensional vector space V is a non-zero multiple of the n-form  where  is a basis of V.

For the standard basis defined in the previous section, we have

By reordering, one can write

Authors variously define ωn or (−1)n/2ωn as the standard volume form. An occasional factor of n! may also appear, depending on whether the definition of the alternating product contains a factor of n! or not.  The volume form defines an orientation on the symplectic vector space .

Symplectic map
Then a linear map  is called a symplectic map if the pullback preserves the symplectic form, i.e. Symplectic maps are volume- and orientation-preserving.

Symplectic group
If , then a symplectic map is called a linear symplectic transformation of V. In particular, in this case one has that , and so the linear transformation f preserves the symplectic form.  The set of all symplectic transformations forms a group and in particular a Lie group, called the symplectic group and denoted by Sp(V) or sometimes .  In matrix form symplectic transformations are given by symplectic matrices.

Subspaces
Let W be a linear subspace of V. Define the symplectic complement of W to be the subspace

The symplectic complement satisfies:

However, unlike orthogonal complements, W⊥ ∩ W need not be 0. We distinguish four cases:
 W is symplectic if }. This is true if and only if ω restricts to a nondegenerate form on W. A symplectic subspace with the restricted form is a symplectic vector space in its own right.
 W is isotropic if . This is true if and only if ω restricts to 0 on W. Any one-dimensional subspace is isotropic.
 W is coisotropic if . W is coisotropic if and only if ω descends to a nondegenerate form on the quotient space W/W⊥. Equivalently W is coisotropic if and only if W⊥ is isotropic. Any codimension-one subspace is coisotropic.
 W is Lagrangian if . A subspace is Lagrangian if and only if it is both isotropic and coisotropic. In a finite-dimensional vector space, a Lagrangian subspace is an isotropic one whose dimension is half that of V. Every isotropic subspace can be extended to a Lagrangian one.

Referring to the canonical vector space R2n above,
 the subspace spanned by {x1, y1} is symplectic
 the subspace spanned by {x1, x2} is isotropic
 the subspace spanned by {x1, x2, ..., xn, y1} is coisotropic
 the subspace spanned by {x1, x2, ..., xn} is Lagrangian.

Heisenberg group

A Heisenberg group can be defined for any symplectic vector space, and this is the typical way that Heisenberg groups arise.

A vector space can be thought of as a commutative Lie group (under addition), or equivalently as a commutative Lie algebra, meaning with trivial Lie bracket. The Heisenberg group is a central extension of such a commutative Lie group/algebra: the symplectic form defines the commutation, analogously to the canonical commutation relations (CCR), and a Darboux basis corresponds to canonical coordinates – in physics terms, to momentum operators and position operators.

Indeed, by the Stone–von Neumann theorem, every representation satisfying the CCR (every representation of the Heisenberg group) is of this form, or more properly unitarily conjugate to the standard one.

Further, the group algebra of (the dual to) a vector space is the symmetric algebra, and the group algebra of the Heisenberg group (of the dual) is the Weyl algebra: one can think of the central extension as corresponding to quantization or deformation.

Formally, the symmetric algebra of a vector space V over a field F is the group algebra of the dual, and the Weyl algebra is the group algebra of the (dual) Heisenberg group . Since passing to group algebras is a contravariant functor, the  central extension map  becomes an inclusion .

See also

 A symplectic manifold is a smooth manifold with a smoothly-varying closed symplectic form on each tangent space.
 Maslov index
 A symplectic representation is a group representation where each group element acts as a symplectic transformation.

References
 Claude Godbillon (1969) "Géométrie différentielle et mécanique analytique", Hermann
 PDF
 Paulette Libermann and Charles-Michel Marle (1987) "Symplectic Geometry and Analytical Mechanics", D. Reidel
 Jean-Marie Souriau (1997) "Structure of Dynamical Systems, A Symplectic View of Physics", Springer 

Linear algebra
Symplectic geometry
Bilinear forms